The water polo competitions at the 2001 Southeast Asian Games in Kuala Lumpur took place from 11 to 15 September 2001 at the National Aquatics Centre within the National Sports Complex. It was one of four aquatic sports at the Games, along with diving, swimming and synchronised swimming.

Medalists

References

2001
Southeast Asian Games
2001 Southeast Asian Games events